Karim Attoumani (born 24 March 2001) is a professional footballer who plays as a centre-back for Dijon B. Born in France, he plays for the Comoros national team.

Career
Attoumani began playing football at the age of 13 at the behest of his father, and is a youth product of the academies of the Réunionnais clubs AG JS Deux-Rives, Parfin, JS Champ-Bornoise, OCSA Léopards, before moving to mainland France with Montpellier in 2019. On 23 September 2021, he moved to the reserves of Dijon.

International career
Born in Réunion, France, Attoumani is Comorian descent. He represented the Comoros U20 at the 2022 Maurice Revello Tournament. He was called up to the senior Comoros national team for a set of friendlies in September 2022. He made his debut with Comoros 1–0 friendly loss to Tunisia on 22 September 2022.

References

External links
 

2001 births
Living people
Sportspeople from Saint-Denis, Réunion
Comorian footballers
Comoros international footballers
Comoros under-20 international footballers
French footballers
French sportspeople of Comorian descent
Association football defenders
Championnat National 3 players
Montpellier HSC players
Dijon FCO players